Levon Stepanyan (born 22 April 1971, in Yerevan) is a retired Armenian football midfielder player and a current coach who played most of his career for Sepahan and previously played for Ararat Yerevan, Zob Ahan and captained Sepahan Novin. Stepanyan was capped for Armenia on one occasion in a 2–1 win against Macedonia on 6 September 1995 in Skopje.

External links

Iran Pro League Stats

1971 births
Living people
Armenian footballers
Soviet footballers
Soviet Armenians
Armenia international footballers
Armenian expatriate footballers
Association football midfielders
FC Ararat Yerevan players
Sepahan S.C. footballers
Sepahan Novin players
Zob Ahan Esfahan F.C. players
Footballers from Yerevan
Expatriate footballers in Iran
F.C. Ararat Tehran players